Hyalaethea sublutea is a moth of the subfamily Arctiinae. It was described by George Thomas Bethune-Baker in 1908. It is found in New Guinea.

References

 Natural History Museum Lepidoptera generic names catalog

Arctiinae
Moths described in 1908